Wolfgang Treu (12 April 1930 in Hamburg – 1 January 2018) was a German cinematographer.

Filmography 
Film
 1964: 
 1966: 4 Schlüssel
 1967: Next Year, Same Time 
 1968: The Castle
 1969: Giselle
 1971: The Salzburg Connection
 1971: Trotta
 1971: 
 1973: The Pedestrian
 1973: 
 1973: The Flying Classroom
 1974: When Mother Went on Strike
 1976: Albino
 1976: 
 1977: 
 1978: Moritz, Dear Moritz
 1979: The Wonderful Years
 1984: The Little Drummer Girl
 1984: Forbidden
 1984: Die zwei Gesichter des Januar
 1985: Maschenka
 1988: 
 1989: 
 1990: Lippels Traum
 1991: Becoming Colette
 1992: Herr Ober!
 1992: Otto – Der Liebesfilm
 2002: Everyman's Feast
Television

 1962: Die achte Runde
 1962: Das ozeanische Fest
 1962–1964: Hafenpolizei (television series)
 1963: Der Tod wählt seine Nummer
 1963: Die Rache des Jebal Deeks
 1964: Der Prozeß Carl von O.
 1964: Hotel Iphigenie
 1965: Eine reine Haut
 1965: 
 1966: Irrungen – Wirrungen
 1966: O süße Geborgenheit
 1966: Jan Himp und die kleine Brise
 1966: Corinne und der Seebär
 1966: S.O.S. – Morro Castle
 1966: Gesellschaftsspiel
 1967: Hochspannung
 1967: Der Mann aus dem Bootshaus
 1967: Play Bach
 1967: Verbotenes Spiel
 1967: Jetzt schlägt’s 13
 1968: Don Kosaken
 1968: Duo
 1968: Solo für einen Dirigenten
 1969: Kapitän Harmsen (television series)
 1969: Die Ballade vom Cowboy
 1969: Lieber Erwin
 1969: Weh’ dem, der erbt
 1970: Maximilian von Mexiko
 1970: Die Journalistin (television series)
 1970: Der Polizeimeister – Joseph Fouché
 1970: Hanna Lessing
 1971: Seine Majestät Gustav Krause
 1971: Das Herz aller Dinge
 1972: Sonderdezernat K1: Vier Schüsse auf den Mörder
 1972: Eine Frau bleibt eine Frau. Zehn Geschichten mit Lilli Palmer
 1972: Sonderdezernat K1: Vorsicht – Schutzengel!
 1972: Sonderdezernat K1: Mord im Dreivierteltakt
 1972: Die Fledermaus
 1973: Im Reservat
 1973: Die Gräfin von Rathenow
 1973: Eine Frau bleibt eine Frau. Neue Geschichten mit Lilli Palmer
 1973: Der zerbrochne Krug
 1974: Salome
 1974: Comenius
 1974: Madame Butterfly
 1975: Lokalseite unten links (television series)
 1975: Die Verschwörung des Fiesco zu Genua
 1975: Der Kommissar: "Der Mord an Dr. Winter"
 1975: Der Biberpelz
 1976: Eine Frau bleibt eine Frau. Drei Geschichten mit Lilli Palmer
 1976: Young Dr. Freud
 1976: Sucht mich nicht, macht weiter
 1977: Auf der Suche nach dem Glück
 1977: Seltsam sind des Glückes Launen
 1977: Der Tod des Camillo Torres oder Die Wirklichkeit hält viel aus
 1977: Arabella
 1978: Jugend, Liebe und die Wacht am Rhein
 1978: L’Orfeo
 1978: Ariadne auf Naxos
 1978: Erzählung eines Unbekannten
 1978–1982: Kümo Henriette (television series)
 1979: Die Krönung der Poppea
 1979: Falstaff
 1979: Egon Schiele
 1979: Die Heimkehr des Odysseus
 1981: Achtung Zoll (television series)
 1981: Hänsel und Gretel
 1981: Die Wildente
 1981: Ein Fall für zwei: "Die große Schwester"
 1982: Wir haben uns doch mal geliebt
 1982: 
 1982: Egmont
 1982: 
 1982: Dort an der Grenze: Kärnten 1966–1976
 1983: Zwei Tote im Sender und Don Carlos im PoGl
 1983: Die Kameraden des Koloman Wallisch
 1983: So ein Theater
 1984: The Devil's Lieutenant
 1984: Storm – Der Schimmelreiter
 1985: A Crime of Honour
 1985: Das Diarium des Dr. Döblinger
 1986: Tatort: Leiche im Keller
 1986: Die Kolonie
 1986: Anna und Franz. Eine Liebe in Europa
 1988: Hemingway (miniseries)
 1988: Cosi fan tutte
 1989: Moffengriet – Liebe tut, was sie will
 1990: Embezzled Heaven
 1991: Tote leben länger
 1993: Madame Bäurin
 1993: Der rote Vogel (miniseries)
 1994: Die Männer vom K3: Ende eines Schürzenjägers
 1994: Kein Platz für Idioten
 1994: Das Traumschiff – Dubai
 1994: Das Traumschiff – Mauritius
 1995: Gabriellas Rache
 1996: Der Mann ohne Schatten: Das Monster
 1996: Der Mann ohne Schatten: Der Mörder unseres Vaters
 1996: Diebinnen
 1997: Freunde
 1997: Der kleine Dachschaden
 1997: Die Männer vom K 3: Zu viele Verdächtige
 1998: Einmal leben
 1998: Ein Mann stürzt ab
 2001: Zum Glück verrückt – Eine unschlagbare Familie

Awards 
 1968: Filmband in Gold (camera) for Das Schloß
 1977: Premio Aladroque a la Mejor Fotografia Cartagena für North Sea Is Dead Sea
 1984: Nomination for the German Camera Awards
 1988: ASC Award: Nomination Finalist (Outstanding Achievement in Cinematography) for Hemingway
 1990: Nomination for the German Camera Awards
 1994: Nomination for the German Camera Awards

References

External links 
 

1930 births
2018 deaths
German cinematographers
Mass media people from Hamburg